The Ladies Titan Tire Challenge was an annual golf tournament for professional women golfers on the Symetra Tour, the LPGA Tour's developmental tour. The event was a part of the Symetra Tour's schedule from 2009 to 2012. It was played at the Hunters Ridge Golf Course in Marion, Iowa.

The title sponsor was Titan Tire, a manufacturer of off-road tires, with headquarters in Des Moines, Iowa.

The tournament was a 54-hole event, as are most Symetra Tour tournaments, and included pre-tournament pro-am opportunities, in which local amateur golfers played with the professional golfers from the Tour as a benefit for local charities. The benefiting charity was the Junior League of Cedar Rapids.

Winners

Tournament record

External links
Symetera Tour official website

Former Symetra Tour events
Golf in Iowa
Marion, Iowa
Recurring sporting events established in 2009
Recurring sporting events disestablished in 2012
2009 establishments in Iowa
2012 disestablishments in Iowa